Marie-Anne-Louise Taschereau (October 18, 1743 – March 16, 1825) was a Canadian nun.  As an Ursuline, she worked as a teacher, and served as a Mother Superior. She was the daughter of Thomas-Jacques Taschereau and Marie-Claire de Fleury de La Gorgendière, and sister of Gabriel-Elzéar Taschereau.

Her father had come to New France from France in 1726, married into a wealthy family and became the owner of the Sainte-Marie seigneury which was the family home.

She entered the Ursuline convent in May, 1764 as a postulant. In August she took the religious habit as Sister Marie-Anne-Louise de Saint-François-Xavier. She had a lifetime of service with the order including serving as its superior.

External links
 Biography at the Dictionary of Canadian Biography Online
 (http://www.canadiana.org/citm/themes/pioneers/pioneers3_e.html) 
 (http://www.premier.gouv.qc.ca/secteur/bienvenue_quebec/decouvrir_quebec_dates_en.htm) 
 Conquest of Quebec

1743 births
1825 deaths
Marie-Anne-Louise
Ursulines
Canadian Roman Catholic religious sisters and nuns